Shangdu Subdistrict is a subdistrict of Xinhua County in Hunan, China. The subdistrict was incorporated through the amalgamation of the former Shangdu Office, three villages of Youjia Town and six villages and a community of Caojia Town on November 6, 2017. The subdistrict has nine villages and seven communities under its jurisdiction, its seat is at East Shangmei Road.

Subdivisions 
Shangdu Subdistrict has five villages and 16 communities under its jurisdiction, as of its creation in 2017.

5 communities
 Qiaoding Community from the former Shangdu Office
 Tangjialing Community from the former Shangdu Office
 Wangcheng Community from the former Shangdu Office
 Xincheng Community from the former Shangdu Office
 Xinyuan Community from Caojia Town

16 villages
 Baisha Village	 from the former Shangdu Office
 Jinzishan Village from Youjia Town
 Niangjia Village from Caojia Town
 Qilichong Village from the former Shangdu Office
 Qingyun Village from Caojia Town
 Qinjian Village from Caojia Town
 Qinsan Village	 from Caojia Town
 Shangdu Village from the former Shangdu Office
 Tashan Village	 from the former Shangdu Office
 Tianzhu Village from Caojia Town
 Tieniu Village	 from the former Shangdu Office
 Tishang Village from Youjia Town
 Xingling Village from Youjia Town
 Zhimushan Village from Caojia Town
 Zijiang Village from the former Shangdu Office
 Ziyuan Village from the former Shangdu Office

References

Divisions of Xinhua County